Carol Brown may refer to:
Carol Brown (actor) (born 1941), Italian actor whose real name is Bruno Carotenuto
Carol Brown (arts administrator), president and CEO of the Pittsburgh Cultural Trust
Carol Brown (baseball), All-American Girls Professional Baseball League player
Carol Brown (Neighbours), a fictional character from the soap opera Neighbours
Carol Brown (physician), physician at Memoral Sloan Kettering Cancer Center
Carol Brown (politician) (born 1963), Australian politician
Carol Brown (rower) (born 1953), American Olympic rower
Carol K. Brown, American artist
Carol Brown, alleged nickname of Assata Shakur
"Carol Brown", a song by Flight of the Conchords featured in the episode "Unnatural Love" of their TV series